The 2015 CAF Confederation Cup group stage was played from 26 June to 13 September 2015. A total of eight teams competed in the group stage to decide the four places in the knockout stage of the 2015 CAF Confederation Cup.

Draw
The draw for the group stage was held on 5 May 2015, 11:00 UTC+2, at the CAF headquarters in Cairo, Egypt. The eight winners of the play-off round were drawn into two groups of four. There were no seedings.

The following eight teams were entered into the draw, whose identity were not known at the time of the draw:

Format
Each group was played on a home-and-away round-robin basis. The winners and runners-up of each group advanced to the semi-finals.

Tiebreakers
The teams were ranked according to points (3 points for a win, 1 point for a draw, 0 points for a loss). If tied on points, tiebreakers would be applied in the following order:
Number of points obtained in games between the teams concerned;
Goal difference in games between the teams concerned;
Goals scored in games between the teams concerned;
Away goals scored in games between the teams concerned;
If, after applying criteria 1 to 4 to several teams, two teams still have an equal ranking, criteria 1 to 4 are reapplied exclusively to the matches between the two teams in question to determine their final rankings. If this procedure does not lead to a decision, criteria 6 to 9 apply;
Goal difference in all games;
Goals scored in all games;
Away goals scored in all games;
Drawing of lots.

Groups
The matchdays were 26–28 June, 10–12 July, 24–26 July, 7–9 August, 21–23 August, and 11–13 September 2015.

Group A

''The Stade Malien v Espérance de Tunis match was suspended at the 49th minute due to heavy rain, and was resumed on 10 August 2015, 16:30 UTC±0, from the point of abandonment.

Group B

References

External links
Orange CAF Confederation Cup 2015, CAFonline.com

2